Adam P. Symson (born 1974) is an American media executive. He serves as the president and chief executive officer of the E. W. Scripps Company, a mass media corporation listed on the NASDAQ.

Early life
Symson was born in 1974. He graduated from the University of California, Los Angeles (UCLA) with a bachelor's degree in Communications.

Career
Symson began his career as an investigative producer for two television stations owned by CBS: WBBM-TV and KCBS-TV. He joined the E. W. Scripps Company in 2002. He first worked for KNXV-TV, and he was chief digital officer from 2011 to 2016, followed by chief operating officer from November 2016 to August 8, 2017.

Symson succeeded Rich Boehne as chief executive officer on August 8, 2017. He was also appointed to its board of directors in 2017. As CEO, he has focused transforming the company by reducing payroll, selling radio stations, expanding into national media and purchasing more local television stations. He earned over $3.4 million in 2018.

Personal life
With his wife Sherri, Symson has two daughters, Logan and Hannah. He serves on the boards of directors for Cincinnati's Holocaust & Humanity Center, the Reporters Committee for the Freedom of the Press and The Jewish Foundation of Cincinnati.

References

Living people
American chief executives
American corporate directors
American media executives
E. W. Scripps Company people
University of California, Los Angeles alumni
1974 births